The Athens Open may refer to:

 The ATP Athens Open, a men's tennis tournament held from 1986 to 1994;
 The WTA Athens Open, a women's tennis tournament held from 1986 to 1990.

See also
Athens Trophy
 OpenAthens, a service of the Eduserv Foundation